An Azali or Azali Bábí is a follower of the monotheistic religion of Subh-i-Azal and the Báb. Early followers of the Báb were known as Bábís; however, in the 1860s a split occurred after which the vast majority of Bábís followed Mirza Husayn ʻAli, known as Baháʼu'lláh, and became known as Baháʼís, while the minority who followed Subh-i-Azal, Baháʼu'lláh's half-brother, came to be called as Azalis.

Azali Babis continued to push for the end of the Iranian monarchy, and several individuals were among the national reformers of the constitutional revolution of 1905-1911. Azalis stagnated and disappeared as an organized community after the revolution, numbering at most a few thousand by the end of the 20th century, mainly in Iran. Azalis are considerably outnumbered by adherents of the Baháʼí Faith, who number in the millions.

Distinguishing characteristics

Azalis do not accept any of those who have advanced claims to be the Báb's promised one (known as "He whom God shall make manifest"). The most bitterly contested claim is that of Baháʼu'lláh in 1863. Azalis rejected his claim of divinity as premature, arguing that the world must first accept the laws of the Báb before "He Whom God Shall Make Manifest" can appear.

Writings of the Báb 
The Azalis in Tehran have printed several volumes of works of the Báb, while the Bahá’ís in Iran have published a mere three volumes exclusively devoted to writings of the Báb. Azalí-produced manuscripts exist in large numbers in Paris, London, and Cambridge.

Former-Baha'i and scholar of the Bábi faith, Denis MacEoin says:

Involvement in Persian secular and constitutional reform
With respect to the direction that Azali Bábism took immediately after the split, MacEoin said:

After the split with the Baháʼís, some Azalis were very active in secular reform movements and the Iranian Constitutional Revolution (1905–1907), including Sheikh Ahmad Rouhi and Mirza Abd-al-Hosayn Kermani. However, the community was still suppressed as a heresy, and the accusation of being an Azali was often enough for most to believe it to be true. Coupled with the Azali practice of taqiyya (dissimulation), determining whether or not a particular figure in Persian politics was an Azali is difficult.

Taqiyya
Taqiya ("dissimulation") was practiced by some Bábís. It was justified by some as a response to the often violent oppression the community faced. However, prominent Bábí leaders never encouraged individuals to practice it; and some who had practiced taqiyya later abandoned it, declared themselves openly, and were put to death.

Among Azalis, however, the practice became ingrained and widespread. One historian has noted:

Succession and aftermath
There was some dispute on the question over who was Subh-i-Azal's appointed successor. MacEoin states that Subh-i-Azal appointed Yahya Dawlatábádí as his successor in turn after the death of his (Yahya's) father, Mirza Hadi Dawlatábádí. However, this was disputed by Subh-i-Azal's grandson, Jalal Azal, indicating that this question was not entirely resolved.

MacEoin notes that, in any event, neither he (Yahya Dawlatábádí) nor anyone else arose to organize the affairs of the community, or produce significant writing to develop the religion. He goes on to say (writing in 1999):

Prominent Azalis 
Despite their small numbers the Azalis have included several prominent Iranian political and literary figures, notably Shaykh Ahmad Ruhi and Mirza Aqa Khan Kirmani.

Notes

Citations

References

Bábism
Iranian religions
Monotheistic religions